Johnny Bayersdorffer (4 September 1899 – 14 November 1969) was a New Orleans jazz cornetist and bandleader.

Bayersdorffer was a popular bandleader at the Spanish Fort resort on Bayou St. John by Lake Pontchartrain. He is best remembered to later generations for his 1920s recordings for Okeh Records.  Bayersdorffer also played with Happy Schilling and Tony Parenti's bands.

References
New Orleans Jazz: A Family Album by Al Rose and Edmond Souchon

1899 births
1969 deaths
Jazz musicians from New Orleans
American jazz cornetists
20th-century American musicians